The 2009 Indian general election polls in Assam were held for 14 seats in the state. United Progressive Alliance won 7 of the 14 seats, these all 7 seats were won by Congress. The NDAs Bharatiya Janata Party won 4 seats and Asom Gana Parishad won one seat.

Winning Candidates

Indian general elections in Assam
2000s in Assam
Assam